Magor Rural District is a defunct district council. It was established under the provisions of the Local Government Act 1894 and comprised the parishes of Bishopston, Kemeys, Christchurch, Goldcliff, Langstone, Llandevenny, Llanwern, Llanvaches, Llanfarthin, Llangattock, Llanhennock, Magor, Nash, Penhow, Redwick, Tredunnock, Whitson and Wilcrick in the administrative county of Monmouthshire. The Rural District Council comprised a number of councillors and a chairman and initially replaced the local sanitary authorities. Its responsibilities included sanitary services, sewerage, refuse collection, maintaining local roads, cemeteries and parks, licensing of public entertainments, water supply and housing. The council was administered by a number of committees and by appointed officers including a Clerk, Treasurer, Medical Officer of Health, Surveyor and Sanitary Inspector. Magor Rural District was abolished in 1935 and was mostly absorbed by the new Magor and St Mellons Rural District.

References
A Vision of Britain: Magor Rural District

History of Newport, Wales
History of Monmouthshire
Rural districts of Wales